Donerail (1910 – after 1918) was an American Thoroughbred racehorse that was the upset winner of the 1913 Kentucky Derby.  His win stands as the biggest longshot victory in the history of the Kentucky Derby. Going off at 91–1, Donerail provided a $184.90 payoff for a $2 bet.

Background 
Donerail was a bay colt sired by McGee and foaled by Algie M. He was owned, bred, and trained by Thomas P. Hayes near Lexington, Kentucky. His jockey was Roscoe Goose.

Before the Derby 
Due to growing popularity, Churchill Downs underwent major renovations in preparation for the derby, the record 30,000 expected attendees and the $6,600 purse. A new era of betting also opened in 1913 as the minimum bet was reduced to $2, making betting more affordable. As a Louisville native, Thomas Hayes was unsure about Donerail's ability to win, regardless of its promise, so decided that the expense and potential loss would not be worth it. But jockey Roscoe Goose convinced Hayes to race Donerail.

Because of the overcrowding at the 1913 Kentucky Derby, there were not enough stables, so Donerail was housed at Douglass Park, about three miles away from Churchill Downs, and would have to walk that distance before the start. This circumstance only added to Hayes’ hesitation about the race. His direction to Goose was not to win, but rather to “get a piece of the purse” by crossing the finish line.

Career
In the 1913 Kentucky Derby, various horses had the lead, and for a time it was Ten Point first, Foundation in second, and Yankee Notions third. Roscoe Goose kept Donerail away from the pacesetters but within striking distance. As the horses turned into the stretch, Ten Point was still leading, but Donerail closed to gain the lead. He crossed the wire half a length ahead of Ten Point. Donerail was drawing away at the finish and set a track record with a time of 2:04 4/5. Donerail's victory was the largest upset of Kentucky Derby history, a record still held to this day, with odds of 91–1 against him.

After the 1913 Kentucky Derby, Donerail continued racing but did not find major success. Of 62 starts, Donerail won 10, placed in 11, and showed in 10. His other major victories came in the Canadian Sportsmen's Handicap and the Hamilton Cup. His career earnings amounted to $15,156.

Later life 
It is not known when Donerail died, and much of what became of him after his racing career ended remains a mystery; however, he was retired in 1917 and briefly used as breeding stallion in Lexington, where he commanded a stud fee of $50. In December 1917, Hayes donated Donerail to the Remount Service for use as a sire of cavalry horses. Gelded and sold to John E. Madden, Donerail reappeared on the turf on May 27, 1918, in New York, where he was eased and dropped out of competition in a mile-long race.

Pedigree

References

Donerail's pedigree with photo
Donerail's Kentucky Derby
Article about Donerail's jockey, Roscoe Goose

1910 racehorse births
Racehorses trained in the United States
Racehorses bred in Kentucky
Kentucky Derby winners
Thoroughbred family A22